Baltimore Fashion Week is an annual fashion event held in the United States. The 15th BFW was held August 13–21, 2022. The next BFW will be August 12–19, 2023.

References

External links
HOME | Baltimore Fashion Week | Maryland

Events in Baltimore
Fashion events in the United States
Culture of Baltimore